Warwick Alan "Wally" Nightingale (3 January 1956 – 6 May 1996) was an English guitarist. He founded the band that went on to become the Sex Pistols.

Early life
Nightingale was born in West Kensington, London. He attended Christopher Wren Boys' School, in Shepherd's Bush, where he met Paul Cook and Steve Jones, who were also pupils.

The Strand and The Swankers
In 1972, at the end of their school years, Nightingale told Cook and Jones they should start a band. The three called themselves The Strand, after Roxy Music's song "Do the Strand"; Jones was the singer, Nightingale played guitar, and Cook was the drummer. Jones and Nightingale stole high-quality instruments and equipment from professional headline musical acts (including Bob Marley, Rod Stewart, and David Bowie) by breaking into venues where they were due to perform. The band began rehearsing at Nightingale's home in East Acton during the day when his parents were out at work. They soon added Del Noones (Paul Cook's brother-in-law) as a bassist, as well as a couple of Steve Jones's friends from Christopher Wren Boys' School, Steve Hayes and Jimmy Macken. They briefly had a conga player named Cecil as well.

By late 1974, the band had begun rehearsing at one of the sound stages of Riverside Studios where Nightingale's father was working. Noones was fired from the band for not attending rehearsals; he was replaced by Glen Matlock, a part-time shop assistant at Malcolm McLaren's clothing shop, where Jones and Cook had begun socialising. During this period Nightingale wrote the music for "Did You No Wrong", a song which eventually became the B-side of the Sex Pistols' single "God Save the Queen".

By this time, Bernie Rhodes had shown an interest in managing the band (which was now called The Swankers), but their only public performance was in early 1975 at a birthday party for one of Cook's friends in Chelsea. At the short three-song gig, the line-up consisted of Jones on vocals, Nightingale on guitar, Matlock on bass and Cook on drums.

Jones, who was impressed by McLaren's prior involvement with the New York Dolls, repeatedly requested that McLaren become the band's manager, and in mid-1975 he agreed. However, McLaren thought Nightingale did not fit the image of the band he had in mind, and told Jones and Cook he would only manage them if they fired Nightingale. Jones, who did not feel comfortable in the singer's role, had been covertly working hard for several months to learn to play guitar. Nightingale was informed that he was being fired upon his arrival for a rehearsal.

The Sex Pistols
With Nightingale gone, the band changed its name to QT Jones & his Sex Pistols at McLaren's suggestion, but the name was soon shortened to The Sex Pistols. McLaren began looking for a new singer, and settled on John Lydon, who frequently hung around his shop. The Sex Pistols played their first gig on 6 November 1975, six months after Nightingale's departure. In a later interview Nightingale recalled watching them perform at the 100 Club in Oxford Street, commenting that his old bandmates Jones and Cook: "wouldn't even talk to me. In hindsight I suppose I'm proud to have been involved in the punk scene, though I don't go around telling everyone of it. After I left (the band) Steve and the others slagged me off in the music press really badly. I never really knew why, I never did them any harm." However, with regard to his views in retrospect on McLaren's part in removing him from the band, in the same interview Nightingale stated: "McLaren was devious and clever. He'd see things which other people didn't see, and I suppose that's what gave him his edge. Malcolm made the Sex Pistols."

Later life
After being forced out of the band, Nightingale continued to pursue a music career, but with limited success. He co-founded a band named Key West in 1981, and a demo of four songs was submitted to Warner Bros. Records, who initially showed interest. The band performed shows, had an MTV video filmed and aired, and recorded some demos at Fastbuck Studios in Chiswick. Key West ultimately failed to earn a recording contract and disbanded after two years.

After his father's death in 1981, Nightingale developed an addiction to narcotics, and was subsequently imprisoned in the early 1980s for six months for a conviction associated with it.

Nightingale's subsequent public musical appearances were rare and sporadic. He appeared as a one-off guest guitarist with the Brentwood punk rock band Beat of the Beast in 1989. In November 1995 he played guitar on the song "Rich Girls" on Mat Sargent's Sex, Drugs & HIV album. During the same month he also performed live with the HIV charity awareness project band the Rock'n'Roll Gypsies.

Death
Nightingale died on 6 May 1996, of a drug-related illness at the age of 40.

Song writing credits
The band that went on to become the Sex Pistols played mainly cover versions of other bands' work, and wrote only two original songs before the arrival of Glen Matlock and John Lydon. One was called "Scarface" (with music by Nightingale and lyrics written by Nightingale's father, according to Glen Matlock) which was never released. The other song was "Did You No Wrong", for which Nightingale composed the music and Jones wrote the original lyrics. Jones' lyrics to the latter song were subsequently rewritten by John Lydon in 1977, but Nightingale's musical arrangement remained unchanged, and the song was commercially released as the b-side to the Sex Pistols' second single “God Save The Queen”. It was later included on the compilation album Flogging a Dead Horse, and was regularly performed live by the band during their reunion tours in the 1990s and 2000s. Performing Rights societies databases recognise Nightingale as the song's co-author, with Cook, Jones, Lydon and Matlock.

References 

1956 births
1996 deaths
Sex Pistols
Drug-related deaths in England
20th-century English musicians
English punk rock guitarists
English male guitarists
People from Kensington
Musicians from London
English electricians
Lead guitarists
20th-century British guitarists
20th-century British male musicians